The European Savings and Retail Banking Group is a European banking association representing around two dozen members from 20 countries (EU and non-EU), comprising approximately 1000 individual savings and retail banks. These institutions operate 60,000 outlets and employ 810,00 people.

At the start of 2015, ESBG members have €500 billion in loans to small and medium-sized enterprises on their books in the European Union, equal to roughly one-third of the EU SME lending market.

History and activities
The European Savings and Retail Banking Group was founded in 1963 as the 'Savings Banks Group of the European Economic Community'. The association changed its name to European Savings Banks Group in 1988 and then to its current name in 2013. ESBG is the sister organization of the World Savings and Retail Banking Institute, with both organizations managed in Brussels by a WSBI-ESBG jointly run Office.

ESBG Members
Albania: Banka Kombetare Tregtare (BKT) 
Austria: Österreichischer Sparkassenverband (Austrian Savings Banks Association) 
Belgium: Coordination of Belgian Savings and Network Banks 
Czech Republic: Česká Spořitelna
Denmark: Lokale Pengeinstitutter 
Finland: Säästöpankkiliitto (Finnish Savings Banks Association) 
France: Groupe BPCE, Fédération Nationale des Caisses d'Epargne (FNCE) (National Federation of Savings Banks) 
Germany: Deutscher Sparkassen- und Giroverband (German Savings Banks Association) 
Hungary: OTP Bank Nyrt 
Iceland: Samband Islenskra Sparisjóda 
Italy: Associazione di Fondazioni e di Casse di Risparmio SpA 
Luxembourg: Banque et Caisse d'Epargne de l'Etat (BCEE) 
Malta: Bank of Valletta Group 
Netherlands: SNS Bank 
Norway: Finance Norway (FNO) 
Portugal: Caixa Geral de Depósitos, Montepio 
Slovakia: Slovenská Sporiteľňa AS
Spain: CaixaBank, CECA 
Sweden: Sparbankernas Riksförbund (Swedish Association of Savings Banks and Savings Bank Foundations), Swedbank 
United Kingdom: Lloyds Banking Group

References

External links 
https://web.archive.org/web/20080607143528/http://pr.euractiv.com/?q=node%2F3416
http://www.cfo-news.com/ESBG-believes-financial-inclusion-should-be-tackled-at-national-level_a5708.html
http://www.wsbi-esbg.org/about-us/
http://ec.europa.eu/transparencyregister/public/consultation/displaylobbyist.do?id=8765978796-80

Banking organizations